The galeries nationales du Grand Palais (Grand Palais National Galleries) are museum spaces located in the Grand Palais in the 8th arrondissement of Paris. They serve as home to major art exhibits and cultural events programmed by the Réunion des musées nationaux et du Grand Palais des Champs-Élysées (RMN), and are open six days a week.

See also 
 List of museums in Paris

External links 
 Galeries nationales du Grand Palais
 Réunion des musées nationaux
 Paris.org entry
 Museums of Paris entry

Museums in Paris
Art museums and galleries in Paris
National museums of France
Buildings and structures in the 8th arrondissement of Paris